Dingnan is a county under the jurisdiction of the prefecture-level city of Ganzhou, in the far south of Jiangxi province, China, bordering Guangdong province to the south. As of the 2020 Chinese census, the population of Dingnan was 209,914. It is a center of Hakka culture.

Administration
The county executive, legislature, judiciary are at Lishi Town, together with the CPC and PSB branches.

Presently, Dingnan County has 7 towns.
7 towns

Climate

References

Ganzhou
County-level divisions of Jiangxi